Murun may refer to:

Places 
 Maran Galu (also romanized as Mūrūn), a village in southeastern Iran
 Mörön, administrative center of the Khövsgöl Province in northern Mongolia
 Murun Massif, Olyokma-Chara Plateau, Russia
 Murun (mountain), highest point of the Murun Massif

Other uses 
 Murun Buchstansangur, a fictional cartoon character